Eoophyla hamalis is a moth in the family Crambidae. It was described by Pieter Cornelius Tobias Snellen in 1875. It was found in Dharmsala, India.

References

Eoophyla
Moths described in 1875
Moths of Asia